Srezojevci is a village in the municipality of Gornji Milanovac, Serbia. According to the 2002 census, the village has a population of 424 people.

Princess consort Ljubica Vukomanović-Obrenović was born in this village in September 1788.

References

Populated places in Moravica District